100000 Astronautica, provisionally designated , is a sub-kilometer asteroid and member of the Hungaria family from the innermost region of the asteroid belt, approximately  in diameter. It was discovered on 28 September 1982, by American astronomer James Gibson at Palomar Observatory, California, United States. The likely bright E-type asteroid was named Astronautica (Latin for "star sailor") on the 50th anniversary of the Space Age.

Orbit and classification 

Astronautica is a core member of the Hungaria family, an asteroid family and dynamical group, which forms the innermost dense concentration of asteroids in the Solar System. It orbits the Sun in the inner asteroid belt at a distance of 1.7–2.1 AU once every 2 years and 8 months (960 days; semi-major axis of 1.9 AU). Its orbit has an eccentricity of 0.09 and an inclination of 21° with respect to the ecliptic. The body's observation arc begins with its discovery observation at Palomar Observatory in September 1982.

Naming 

This minor planet marked the milestone of the 100,000th numbered minor planet in October 2005. It was named by the International Astronomical Union's Committee on Small Body Nomenclature to recognize the 50th anniversary of the start of the Space Age, as marked by the launch of the Soviet Sputnik spacecraft into orbit on 4 October 1957. The official  was published by the Minor Planet Center on 26 September 2007. The number 100,000 is significant because it marks the altitude in meters where outer space begins, as delineated by the Kármán line established by the Fédération Aéronautique Internationale. The name "Astronautica" is Latin for "star sailor".

Physical characteristics 

Most members of the Hungaria family are E-type asteroids, which means they have extremely bright enstatite surfaces and albedos typically around 0.35. As of 2018, no rotational lightcurve of Astronautica has been obtained from photometric observations. The body's rotation period, pole and shape remain unknown.

See also 
 1000 Piazzia (the one thousandth numbered minor planet)

References

External links 
 Division F WG Small Bodies Nomenclature (SBN), IAU
 Dictionary of Minor Planet Names, Google books
 Discovery Circumstances: Numbered Minor Planets (100001)-(105000) – Minor Planet Center
 
 

100000
Discoveries by James B. Gibson (astronomer)
Named minor planets
19820928
Space Age